Cristian Molinaro (born 30 July 1983) is an Italian professional football official and a former full-back. He works as a technical director for  club Venezia. He represented the Italy national team.

Club career

Early career
Molinaro started playing at age 5 for Gelbison, in Vallo della Lucania, before growing up in the various Salernitana youth teams.

In 2002–03 he made his league debut in Serie B. This marked the beginning of the two competitive seasons he played as a starter in Salerno, that included his first professional goal in 2004–05 in a match against Bari. In 2005, he moved to Siena, a club that he played for two seasons.

Siena and Juventus
In 2005, he was noticed by the dense network of observers of Juventus and signed, who decided to sell him in co-ownership to Siena, in which Juventus already had several players on loan. He made his debut in Serie A on 18 September 2005 in Siena - Palermo 1–2 and his first season in the top flight was characterised by ups and downs; losing the role of starting left-back to the more experienced Gianluca Falsini.

For 2006–07, Juventus, relegated to Serie B by the 2006 Italian football scandal, allowed Molinaro to remain at Siena (who sold Falsini), relying on him to cover the role of left-back. He collected 36 appearances out of 38 league games and two appearances in 2 rounds of Coppa Italia.

On 20 June 2007, shortly before the transfer window deadline, Juventus redeemed him for a sum of €2.5 million. During 2007–08, at age 24, he carved out a starting spot on the left wing of the defence of Juventus, thanks to the movement of companion Giorgio Chiellini to central defence.

In his second season at Juventus he debuted 13 August 2008 in the first leg of the third qualifying round of the Champions League, won 4–0 against Petržalka, which also represented his debut in European competition. On 28 November 2008 he extended his contract with Juventus until 2013. He finished the 2008–09 season prematurely because of a perirenal hematoma.

Stuttgart
With the arrival of Italy international Fabio Grosso and Uruguayan Martín Cáceres in the summer, Molinaro signed a loan deal with VfB Stuttgart on 5 January 2010 which initially saw him stay at the club until the end of the 2009–10 season. On 1 June 2010, VfB Stuttgart took advantage of a contract option and signed Molinaro permanently until June 2014. Juventus announced that on 14 June they received €3.9 million transfer fees and the deal was completed.

During the first round of the 2013–14 Bundesliga season, Molinaro only played once. Kicker and other media reported that VfB Stuttgart sought to offload him.

Parma

On 30 January, Parma announced that they had signed Cristian Molinaro. On 16 February 2014, he scored his first goal with the shirt of Parma, as well as first in Serie A, against Atalanta for the momentary 0–1. Shortly afterwards, in his first game against his former team, Juventus, he scored his second goal in Serie A.

Torino

On 16 June 2014, Molinaro was signed by Torino on an annual contract. He made his debut with the Granata in the third round of the 2014–15 Europa League against Brommapojkarna. On 25 June 2015, Torino exercised the option to extend his contract. He played a total of 38 games and scored one goal, in a 2–1 victory against Inter Milan.

On 18 September 2016, he ruptured his anterior cruciate ligament in a home game against Empoli. He returned on 13 March 2017, during a match against Lazio. After renewing his contract with Torino until June 2018, he continued to play for Torino until he fractured the head of his fibula in February. After the injury, he played his hundredth game for Torino on 29 April away against Lazio. At the end of the season he was released on a free transfer.

Frosinone
On 12 July 2018, Christian Molinaro joined Serie A club Frosinone on a free transfer.

Venezia
After not playing in the first half of the 2019–20 season, he signed with Serie B club Venezia on 15 January 2020 for the remainder of the season.

International career
Molinaro received his first international call-up on 6 August 2010 under new head coach Cesare Prandelli. He made his debut on 10 August 2010, starting in the match against Ivory Coast. He was also called up for the games against Estonia and Faroe Islands in the Euro 2012 qualifiers.

Post-playing career
On 13 June 2022, Venezia announced Molinaro's retirement from playing and his appointment to the position of the team's technical director.

Career statistics

Club

International

References

External links
 Gazzetta dello Sports player profile 
 Lega Serie A profile 
 Profile at kicker.de 
 Profile at FIGC.it 

1983 births
Living people
Sportspeople from the Province of Salerno
Italian footballers
Italy international footballers
Italian expatriate footballers
Association football defenders
U.S. Salernitana 1919 players
A.C.N. Siena 1904 players
Juventus F.C. players
VfB Stuttgart players
Parma Calcio 1913 players
Torino F.C. players
Frosinone Calcio players
Venezia F.C. players
Serie A players
Serie B players
Bundesliga players
Expatriate footballers in Germany
Footballers from Campania